William A. Kay (April 4, 1925 – May 23, 2007) was an American football tackle in the National Football League (NFL). He played college football for the University of Iowa.

University of Iowa
Kay was a prominent member of the Iowa Hawkeyes football team of the University of Iowa. His all-star jersey can be seen in the Iowa Football Museum.

1946

Kay is listed as team MVP. Kay helped clear the way for Bob Smith, the team's first 500-yard rusher since Ozzie Simmons in 1936.

1948

He was selected second-team All-American and first-team All-Big Nine  by the Associated Press. He led the conference in minutes played. In his final game, he blocked a punt and recovered it in the end zone for an Iowa touchdown in a win over Boston University. Kay also played in all-star football games.

New York Giants
Kay entered the 1949 season injured. He was drafted in the 4th round of the 1949 NFL Draft by the New York Giants. Kay was one of seven tackles signed to the team in 1949. Kay signed a one-year contract reportedly worth $6,750. He entered the draft injured and unfortunately, never played a professional game.

References

1925 births
2007 deaths
American men's basketball players
American football tackles
Iowa Hawkeyes football players
New York Giants players
People from Pottawattamie County, Iowa
Players of American football from Iowa
Basketball players from Iowa